Arturo Elías Ayub (born April 27, 1966) is a Mexican businessman, currently Director of Strategic Alliances of Teléfonos de Mexico, CEO of the Telmex Foundation and director of UNO Noticias.

Life and career 
Elías Ayub was born in Mexico City, he is the younger brother of Alfredo Elías Ayub. Graduated as Bachelor of Business Administration by the Universidad Anáhuac (Anáhuac University), and later studied a postgraduate course in Business Management at the IPADE.

He is married to Johanna Slim, daughter of businessman Carlos Slim, and they have three children.

Professional activity 
He joined TELMEX in 1996 as Advisor of the Directorate and in 2001 took over as chairman of the board of the of Association Football team known as Club Universidad Nacional, or commonly "UNAM Pumas" in Mexico. During his tenure at the club managed to get a "double championship" in the Clausura 2004 and Opening 2004. In 2005 decided not to be re-elected in the patronage.

Currently he serves on the board of directors of Grupo Carso, Grupo Inbursa, Telmex, CEO of Telmex Foundation and Chairman of the Instituto Telmex del Deporte (TELMEX Institute for Sports).

See also 
 Grupo CARSO
 Telmex

References

External links 
 
 Grupo Carso's Website

1966 births
Living people
Businesspeople from Mexico City
Mexican people of Syrian descent